Karsten Möring (born 30 August 1949) is a German teacher and politician of the Christian Democratic Union (CDU) who served as a member of the Bundestag from the state of North Rhine-Westphalia from 2013 until 2021.

Political career 
Born in Schneverdingen, Lower Saxony, Möring became a member of the Bundestag in the 2013 German federal election, representing Cologne. He was a member of the Committee on Construction, Housing, Urban Development and Communities and the Committee on the Environment, Nature Conservation and Nuclear Safety.

He was elected in Cologne I in 2017, defeating Martin Dörmann from the SPD.

References

External links 

  
 Bundestag biography 

1949 births
Living people
Members of the Bundestag for North Rhine-Westphalia
Members of the Bundestag for the Christian Democratic Union of Germany
Members of the Bundestag 2017–2021
Members of the Bundestag 2013–2017